Neblinichthys peniculatus is a species of catfish in the family Loricariidae. It is native to South America, where it occurs in the Carapo River, which is part of the Paragua River basin in Venezuela. It is reportedly found in two rapids complexes in the Carapo. The species reaches 8.1 cm (3.2 inches) SL.

References 

Ancistrini
Fish described in 2013